Neomyia viridescens is a species of fly which is distributed across many parts the Palaearctic.

References

Muscidae
Diptera of Europe
Insects described in 1830
Taxa named by Jean-Baptiste Robineau-Desvoidy